The Spanish mole (Talpa occidentalis) is a species of mammal in the family Talpidae. It is found in Spain and Portugal.

References

Talpa
Endemic mammals of the Iberian Peninsula
Taxonomy articles created by Polbot
Mammals described in 1907